Dungeon synth is a genre of electronic music that merges elements of black metal and dark ambient. The style emerged in the early 1990s, predominantly among members of the second wave black metal scene, such  as Mortiis,  Burzum, Robert Fudali of Lord Wind and Graveland, Tomi Kalliola of Azaghal and Valar, Sigurd Wongraven of Wongraven and Satyricon, Andreas Bettinger of Grausamkeit, Silenius and Protector of Summoning, Die Verbannten Kinder Evas, Abigor, Pazuzu, and Grabesmond, Ray Heflin of Absu, and Equitant, among others.

The genre employs aesthetics and themes typically associated with black metal juxtaposed to the typical heavy tremolo-picking, blast-beats, and harsh, shrieked vocals of black metal by way of compositions of instrumental or ambient music commonly used as introductions, interludes, or "outros" in black metal, death metal, and heavy metal albums throughout the 1980s and 1990s. Though often paired with medieval and fantasy motifs throughout the 1990s onward, some prominent contemporaries of dungeon synth reject the excessive prevalence of high-fantasy themes. Dungeon synth is occasionally contentiously likened to video game music, as some very general thematic overlap may exist in sparse examples of each, but Mortiis and others have rejected the influence of video game soundtracks on dungeon synth. 

Mortiis (Håvard Ellefsen) is a major performer of this genre and the style is heavily prevalent in early releases such as Født til å Herske and later releases from the return to the "Era I" sound, chiefly Spirit of Rebellion. Other prominent contemporaries of the genre include Old Tower, Sombre Arcane, Thangorodrim, and Fenwalker; some of which have toured or regularly performed live on top of publishing music. Mortiis, alongside Burzum, is normally cited as the de facto progenitor of the genre proper, and each is regularly cited as having influenced later acts associated with dungeon synth.

Origins

Proto-dungeon synth 
Since the coining of the term, dungeon synth fans have on occasion identified disparate influences on early dungeon synth pioneers and on the rare occasion, have had their suspicions corroborated. Namely, Tangerine Dream and Klaus Schulze have been cited by Mortiis as early influences, as well as Skinny Puppy and Enigma. Varg Vikernes has cited Das Ich, Dead Can Dance, Tangerine Dream and Pyotr Ilyich Tchaikovsky among his own influences. Finnish dungeon synth musician Tuomas M. Mäkelä of Jääportit has cited Dead Can Dance and Arcana among their influences. Robert Nusslein (founding member of Ritual) of Casket of Dreams has listed Tangerine Dream, Velvet Acid Christ, Dead Can Dance, and Death in June among his influences.

Several industrial and post-punk artists are often invoked as proto-dungeon synth artists or influences on early dungeon synth pioneers including Nurse with Wound, Death in June, In the Nursery, Cocteau Twins, Throbbing Gristle, and many other prominent industrial artists of the 1970s and 1980s.

Traditional heavy metal 
Though almost universally associated with the orchestral, atmospheric, and ambient intros, interludes, and outros of 1990s black metal albums, proto-dungeon synth can also be found heavily interspersed in many of the same sections of traditional heavy metal and other extreme metal genres of the 1970s and 1980s.

Similar instances of fantastical ambient, orchestral, or neoclassical music can also be heard in Rainbow's "Gates of Babylon" from Long Live Rock 'n' Roll. Each of the following tracks are also examples of non-black metal heavy metal tracks which feature fantastical ambient, orchestral, or neoclassical music that could, arguably, be said to either influence artists later associated with dungeon synth.

While less prevalent in the black metal albums of the 1990s, heavy metal has borrowed heavily from high-fantasy imagery and motifs since its fledgling days. This indelible link between heavy metal and high fantasy would eventually lead to the colloquial moniker "castle metal" to describe acts of the genre that are mired in the motifs typical of high fantasy art and literature. Mortiis has cited Venom, W.A.S.P., Angel Witch, Kiss, and others among his own heavy metal influences, even citing their high-fantasy leanings on occasion. Sigurd "Satyr" Wongraven has cited Rainbow, Black Sabbath, and other heavy metal bands among his own influences, and the members of Summoning have made similar claims regarding their earliest influences.

Kosmische musik 

Various musical methods of composition prevalent in dungeon synth are often attributed to German kosmische musik artists. Kosmische musik themes were largely inspired by space travel, futurism, and industrialism rather than typical fantasy tropes, but contributed to subsequent genres by way of normalizing "beatless" music which would permeate industrial music and derivative forms such as Ambient and New Age, eventually influencing earlier dungeon synth musicians (or perhaps proto-dungeon synth musicians from the 1980s) and their minimal compositions which were occasionally purely ambient. While only occasionally sharing thematic overlap, dungeon synth musicians would indelibly borrow significantly from kosmische musik by way of musicology and theory.

A few typical examples of "cosmic-oriented" dungeon synth and adjacent releases can be found in early releases, though the style is more prevalent in contemporary works. Mortiis published a seven-inch single of comparable music on his own record label Dark Dungeon Music from his early side-project Fata Morgana. Fenriz published two albums of similar music from his own side-project Neptune Towers. The works of Solanum (one half of Depressive Silence) bear comparable themes of space in the artwork, titles, and other errata, though are not as explicitly composed with sounds reminiscent of kosmische musik. The early works of black metal musician and composer Henri Sorvali also present similar characteristics which could be associated to kosmische musik, including Lunar Womb's Astral Grief and Planets.

1990s 
The origins of dungeon synth as a genre unto itself are largely rooted in the early 1990s with the release of a few specific pieces of music now retroactively called "dungeon synth". These include Jim Kirkwood's "Where Shadows Lie" released sometime in 1990, followed by "Master of Dragons" in 1991. During this time, Mortiis was still a member of Emperor and had yet to publish any solo material. In 1992, Kirkwood published two more releases on cassette and a new name enters the canon: Vidar Våer of Ildjarn, formerly of Thou Shalt Suffer (also connected to Emperor), and his 1992 black metal/dungeon synth demo tape "Unknown Truths". In March 1992, roughly a year-and-a-half before his murder, Euronymous published the Burzum self-titled debut album through his record label Deathlike Silence Productions, marking the first time a prominent member of the 2nd wave of black metal released material combining black metal tracks with ambient, synth-driven tracks and industrial-esque atmospheric tracks on the same record. This is also the first known use of the word "dungeon" on a record that would later be cited as proto-dungeon synth.

1993 

By 1993, dungeon synth as a style of black metal separate from the traditional instrumentation of black metal would become visibly apparent with the beginnings of Mortiis' "Era 1" material. Ellefsen, after his departure from Emperor, purchased a Roland keyboard and created the first Mortiis demo: The Song Of A Long Forgotten Ghost. This first demo, clocking in at just under an hour in length, marked the first time a black metal musician would publish a work that "looked" like a typical black metal demo tape but contained entirely instrumental and non-traditional black metal instrumentation. The first iteration of this demo, self-released by Ellefsen, was circulated in an unknown number of copies on consumer-grade cassettes with a Xerox copied insert; a do it yourself practice typical of black metal and other genres of underground music.

The second iteration of this demo tape would be the first time Ellefsen would use the phrase "dark dungeon music" to refer to this burgeoning style of dark ambient music.

Also in 1993, and worthy of mention, is the short-lived Danish project Dark Funeral (not to be confused with the Swedish band of the same name). This demo is occasionally invoked alongside Mortiis' earliest works as another example of nascent dungeon synth but the project quickly ended after releasing two demos.

Again, in 1993, Jim Kirkwood would publish two more works which would retroactively be touted as influencing early dungeon synth music: Through A Dark Glass and Tower of Darkness. Though each work can only tenuously be called dungeon synth, Kirkwood's overall influence is indelible when considering the prevalence of the Berlin School on dungeon synth, overall.

1994 
1994 saw the publication of several albums, E.P.s, and demos now considered canon in dungeon synth; of particular merit is the seminal work Født til å Herske, Pazuzu's ...And All Was Silent (featuring both Richard Lederer and Michael Gregor later of Summoning), Tears of the Weeping Willow and Lost Woods by Cernunnos Woods, and several others including Lamentation, Black Wailing, Erevos, Equitant, Asmorod, Landscape, and Wintergods.

References